Group B of the 2016 OFC Nations Cup took place from 28 May to 4 June 2016. The group consisted of Fiji, New Zealand, Solomon Islands and Vanuatu.

Teams

Notes

Standings

In the semi-finals:
The winners of Group B, New Zealand, advanced to play the runners-up of Group A, New Caledonia.
The runners-up of Group B, Solomon Islands, advanced to play the winners of Group A, Papua New Guinea.

Matches

New Zealand vs Fiji

Vanuatu vs Solomon Islands

Vanuatu vs New Zealand

Solomon Islands vs Fiji

Fiji vs Vanuatu

New Zealand vs Solomon Islands

References

External links
 

Group B
2018 FIFA World Cup qualification (OFC)
Nations Cup group
Nations Cup group